Tromsø Cathedral is a cathedral of the Church of Norway located in the city of Tromsø in Tromsø Municipality in Troms og Finnmark county, Norway. The cathedral is the church for the Tromsø Domkirkens parish and it is the headquarters for the Tromsø domprosti (arch-deanery) and the Diocese of Nord-Hålogaland. This cathedral is notable since it is the only Norwegian cathedral made of wood.

The yellow, wooden cathedral was built in a long church format and in the Gothic Revival style in 1861 by the architect Christian Heinrich Grosch. The church tower and main entrance are on the west front. It is probably the northernmost Protestant cathedral in the world. With over 600 seats, it is one of Norway's biggest wooden churches. It originally held about 984 seats, but many benches and seats have been removed over the years to make room for tables in the back of the church.

History
The structure was completed in 1861 after the diocese was established in 1844. Christian Heinrich Grosch was the architect. It was built using a cog joint method. It is situated in the middle of the city of Tromsø (on the island of Tromsøya) on a site where in all likelihood there has been a church since the 13th century.

The first church in Tromsø was built in 1252 by King Haakon IV as a royal chapel. It belonged to the king, therefore, not the Catholic Church. This church is mentioned several times in the Middle Ages as "St. Mary's near the Heathens" (Sanctae Mariae juxta Pagano).

Not much is known about the previous churches on the site, but it is known that in 1711 a new church was built on this site. That church was replaced in 1803. That church was moved out of the city in 1860 to make way for the building of the present cathedral. The 1803 church building was relocated to an area a few hundred metres south of the city boundary and then in the early 1970s it was moved again to the site of the present Elverhøy Church further up the hills in the city. This church is still there and contains a number of pieces of art that have adorned the churches in Tromsø from the Middle Ages, the oldest of which is a figure of the Madonna, possibly of the 15th century.

The present cathedral was consecrated on 1 December 1861 by the Bishop Carl Peter Essendrop. In 1862, the bell tower was completed and the bell was installed. All of the interior decorations and art were not completed until the 1880s. The cathedral cost about 10,000 Speciedalers to build.

Interior
The cathedral interior is dominated by the altar with a copy of the painting Resurrection by the noted artist Adolph Tidemand. Under the picture is a quote from the Gospel of John. Stained glass windows in the front of the church, designed by Gustav Vigeland, were installed in 1960.

Media gallery

See also
List of churches in Nord-Hålogaland
Arctic Cathedral - another church in Tromsø, noted for its architecture.
Cathedral of Our Lady, Tromsø - Catholic cathedral.

References

External links

 Picture of Tromsø Cathedral

Churches in Tromsø
Churches in Troms
Cathedrals in Norway
Lutheran cathedrals in Norway
Gothic Revival church buildings in Norway
Wooden churches in Norway
19th-century Church of Norway church buildings
Churches completed in 1861
13th-century establishments in Norway
Long churches in Norway